Gymnopilus panelloides is a species of mushroom in the family Hymenogastraceae.

See also

List of Gymnopilus species

External links
Gymnopilus panelloides at Index Fungorum

palmicola
Fungi of North America